Federal University Dutsin-Ma established  by the administration of former President Goodluck Ebele Jonathan. It was founded in February 2011 which is located in Katsina state. The Vice Chancellor is Bichi Armaya'u Hamisu. The University fully started by 2012.

University Library 
The library was established in 2012 to support teaching, learning and research of both students and staff of the university and it is located at the main Library. the library subscribed database are Science Direct, HINARI, AGORA,ARDI with online journals like JSTOR, African journal online, digital contents.

References

Federal universities of Nigeria
Educational institutions established in 2011
2011 establishments in Nigeria
Katsina State